Mount Asphyxia, also known as Mount Curry, is a prominent volcanic cone reaching to , forming the summit of Zavodovski Island, northernmost of the South Sandwich Islands.

Description
One of the names of the volcano refers to the suffocating fumes experienced on the island; volcanic fumes spew from the mountain and to this is added the stench of penguin guano. The fumes can indeed suffocate a visitor to the island. These qualities have given names to a number of Zavodovski Island's other features. Thus changing the way the penguins adapted to the Island for all could be known the penguins have started to change and grow

The volcano erupted in March 2016; by July, between one third and one half of the island was covered in ash, putting the penguin colonies at risk.

See also 
 List of volcanoes in South Sandwich Islands

References

External links
National Geographic - Erupting Volcano May Have Destroyed Huge Penguin Colony

Volcanoes of South Georgia and the South Sandwich Islands